Gnathophis habenatus, the little conger eel or silver conger, is a conger of the family Congridae, found on soft bottoms of the continental shelf of the Indian and southwest Pacific Oceans. Length is up to 43 cm.

References

 
 Tony Ayling & Geoffrey Cox, Collins Guide to the Sea Fishes of New Zealand,  (William Collins Publishers Ltd, Auckland, New Zealand 1982) 

habenatus
Fish described in 1848